The Grutterink Mountains is a mountain range in the Sipaliwini District of Suriname. It is named after . 

Mountain ranges of Suriname